Nilakkal Mahadeva Temple is a Hindu temple located in Nilakkal, in the eastern side of Pathanamthitta district in the Indian state of Kerala. The temple is dedicated to Lord Shiva. Ayappa worshipped Shivling here It is one of the important "idathavalam" or halting place for the Sabarimala pilgrims. The shrine is administrated by Travancore Devaswom Board. During Sabarimala pilgrimage, many devotees visit the temple and probably on these days Nilakkal will be crowded with devotees.

Location 
It is located just 1 km from the main highway leading to Sabarimala temple. The shrine is surrounded by thick forests and rubber plantations.

Worship 
Lord Shiva is the principal deity. The pratishta is believed to be in two moods, Ugramoorthy (fierce) and Mangala pradayakan (auspicious). A common belief is that Lord Shiva is showering his blessings to his son Lord Ayyappa to fight against all evil spirits while throwing all anger to the evils. As in many Shiva shrines, a number of oxen are protected in the temple premises.

Subordinate deities 
There is only two Upa Prathishtas (sub deities) here, Lord Kannimoola Ganapathi and Nandi.

Poojas
Three Poojas are held here every day. The morning section includes Usha pooja, noon section with Ucha pooja and the desk section concludes with Deeparadhana. Special weekly days are Sunday, Monday and Friday.

Festivals 
The 'Maha Shivaratri' held annually is one of the noted festivals of the temple. Besides Shivarathri, the temple celebrates its Thiruvutsavam every year in grand style. At times of Sabarimala pilgrimage, devotees from various states visits the temple for welfare and sake.

See also
 Sabarimala
 List of Hindu temples in Kerala

References

Hindu temples in Pathanamthitta district
Shiva temples in Kerala